Natrez Deshun Patrick (born July 9, 1997) is an American football linebacker who is a free agent. Originally from Atlanta, Georgia, Patrick played college football for four seasons for the University of Georgia Bulldogs.

High school 
At Mays High School, Patrick was named USA Today All-USA second-team after recording 111 total tackles (27 for loss) during his senior season.  He was named to the Atlanta Journal-Constitution's 2014 All-State Class AAAAA defense and named its 2014 Defensive Player of the Year, as well as the Georgia Sports Writers Association 2014 All-State Class AAAAA first-team and 2014 Defensive Player of the Year. He was named a four-star prospect by Rivals.com, ESPN, Scout.com, and played in the 2015 U.S. Army All American Bowl.

College career 
Patrick was a four-year starter at Georgia, an explosive player credited by coaches and teammates alike for his leadership qualities.

He enrolled at UGA on January 1, 2015, after receiving offers from two dozen other Power 5 programs.

Patrick was named a preseason All-SEC honoree by Athlon Sports prior to the 2018 season even after a four-game suspension limited his playing time his junior year.

Career stats

Professional career

Los Angeles Rams
After going undrafted in the 2019 NFL Draft, Patrick was signed as a free agent by the Los Angeles Rams on April 29, 2019.

On September 5, 2020, Patrick was waived by the Rams and signed to the practice squad the next day. He was elevated to the active roster on September 19 for the team's week 2 game against the Philadelphia Eagles, and reverted to the practice squad after the game. He was promoted to the active roster on September 24, 2020. He was waived on November 10, 2020, and re-signed to the practice squad the next day. He was signed to the active roster on November 28, 2020. On January 7, 2021, Patrick was waived by the Rams.

Denver Broncos
On January 8, 2021, Patrick was claimed off waivers by the Denver Broncos, but the claim was deferred until after the Super Bowl on February 8. He was waived/injured on June 17, 2021, and placed on injured reserve.

Detroit Lions
On May 16, 2022, Patrick signed with the Detroit Lions. He was waived on July 28, 2022.

Personal life
Patrick was arrested three times for misdemeanor marijuana possession, resulting in two suspensions. The last one landed him in a treatment facility that caused him to miss UGA's 2018 Rose Bowl and the National Championship Game, despite a "penny-sized" amount of the drug being found in a teammate's car and being claimed by the vehicle's owner. Charges were subsequently dropped.

References

External links 
 Georgia Bulldogs bio
 Los Angeles Rams bio

1997 births
Living people
American football linebackers
Denver Broncos players
Detroit Lions players
Georgia Bulldogs football players
Los Angeles Rams players
Players of American football from Atlanta